Jesse M. Peters (July 21, 1897 – March 7, 1962) was a member of the Wisconsin State Senate.

Biography
Peters was born in Iron Ridge, Wisconsin. During World War I, he served in the United States Army. He died on March 7, 1962, in Hartford, Wisconsin.

Political career
Peters was a member of the Senate from 1939 to 1942. Previously, he was District Attorney of Washington County, Wisconsin from 1929 to 1930. He was a Republican.

References

External links
 The Political Graveyard
 

People from Hartford, Wisconsin
Republican Party Wisconsin state senators
Wisconsin lawyers
Military personnel from Wisconsin
United States Army soldiers
United States Army personnel of World War I
1897 births
1962 deaths
20th-century American politicians
People from Iron Ridge, Wisconsin
20th-century American lawyers